America Chavez is a superhero appearing in American comic books published by Marvel Comics. Created by Joe Casey and Nick Dragotta, the character first appeared in Vengeance #1 (September 2011). She later starred in her own comic book series in March 2017, America, written by Gabby Rivera. America Chavez is a member of the Young Avengers. She is the second character to use the moniker Miss America, after Madeline Joyce.

America Chavez has been described as one of Marvel's most notable and powerful female heroes, being labelled as the publisher's first Latin-American LGBTQ+ character to star in a comic book series as the eponymous character.

The character made her live-action debut in the Marvel Cinematic Universe film Doctor Strange in the Multiverse of Madness (2022), portrayed by Xochitl Gomez.

Publication history
America Chavez first appeared in the 2011 limited series Vengeance by Joe Casey and Nick Dragotta. Chavez later appears in the 2013 Young Avengers series by Kieron Gillen and Jamie McKelvie and in the 2015 series A-Force by G. Willow Wilson, Marguerite Bennett and Jorge Molina. Beginning in October 2015, Chavez has appeared in Ultimates by Al Ewing and Kenneth Rocafort as part of the All-New, All-Different Marvel initiative. At the 2016 New York Comic Con, Marvel announced that Chavez would receive her first solo series—simply titled America, with various critics praising the creation of a comic book series with Chavez as the titular character. That series, written by Latin-American novelist Gabby Rivera, launched in March 2017, and was eventually canceled in April 2018. In August 2018, Chavez joined the West Coast Avengers in a series by writer Kelly Thompson and artist Stefano Caselli.

Fictional character biography
America Chavez believed she was raised by her mothers in the Utopian Parallel, a reality that is out of time and in the presence of the being known as the Demiurge, whose presence she credited with imbuing her with superpowers. In her memory, when Chavez was approximately six years old, the Utopian Parallel was threatened by destruction with black holes. Chavez's mothers sacrificed themselves to seal the black holes, resulting in their particles being scattered across the Multiverse itself. Wanting to prove herself as a hero and knowing Utopia didn't require salvation, Chavez ran away from her home and her responsibilities. She traveled across different realities, eventually adopted the moniker of Miss America, and began covertly acting as a superhero.

Chavez eventually joined the Teen Brigade and served as co-leader with Ultimate Nullifier. With the Teen Brigade, she freed the In-Betweener from the government confinement center, "Groom Lake Adjacent" in Nevada. With information from the In-Betweener, The Teen Brigade set out to prevent the Young Masters Evil from disrupting a delicate balance between chaos and order. To stop the Young Masters from recruiting Kid Loki, Chavez broke into the Metropolitan Museum of Art, but Loki used the Screaming Idol to send her to the Sixth Dimension. There she fought Tiboro, and was later rescued by the Last Defenders, She-Hulk, and Daimon Hellstrom, under the direction of the In-Betweener. She rejoined her teammates in Latveria where they fought the Braak'nhüd, Young Masters and Doctor Doom. The battle was ended when Ultimate Nullifier shot the In-Betweener. While the smoke cleared, the Teen Brigade covertly departed. Chavez would later part ways with the Teen Brigade due to "musical differences."

After leaving the Teen Brigade, Chavez eventually traveled to Earth-212 and was later approached by the teenage trickster Loki. He pretends to try to persuade Chavez into killing Wiccan for the good of the Multiverse. Disgusted with the proposition, Chavez fights with Loki and decides to protect Wiccan. On Earth-616, Chavez stopped Loki from magically attacking Wiccan in his home. Hulkling intervened, but America and Loki quickly fled with little explanation. Chavez later rescued Hulkling, Wiccan, and Loki from the Mother, an inter-dimensional parasite awoken by one of Loki's spells. They all escape aboard Marvel Boy's ship, and aided them in the final face-off with Mother's forces in Central Park. Later, in Young Avengers #15, she reveals offhandedly to the team that she is not interested in men, and writes off her one-time kiss with the male teen superhero Ultimate Nullifier as experimentation. She later begins dating Lisa, an EMT, and dances with her to "close a hole in the universe." She also had a crush on Lady Katherine of Bishop, an alternate version of Kate Bishop, and they have a close relationship.

During the 2015 Secret Wars storyline, Chavez appears as a member of the A-Force, an all-female team of Avengers. Her fans formed a gang called La Chiquitas and changed their hair to Chavez symbols, including fan Sydney Walker.  When the island nation of Arcadia is attacked by a megalodon, Chavez throws the shark across the Shield, the wall that separates Arcadia's borders, thus breaking the laws of King Doom. She is subsequently arrested and sentenced to spend the rest of her life protecting the Shield.

After the events of Secret Wars, Chavez joined the newly formed Ultimates team after being invited by Blue Marvel. Chavez also attends Sotomayor University as a student, where she also shares a class with former Young Avenger teammate Prodigy.

In the series America Chavez: Made in the USA, what Chavez knew about her background was called into question. Her previously unknown sister, Catalina, forced her to remember that her mothers were not aliens, but human doctors Amalia and Elena Chavez. The doctors took their daughters to a private island called the Utopian Parallel to attempt to cure the disease Edges Syndrome, but discovered their benefactor had evil plans for all the girls brought there. Chavez gained her superpowers across experiments conducted on her as a child, when she was exposed to extra-dimensional energies. The doctors sacrificed themselves to free America and Catalina, but only America escaped. Catalina suggests that America made up the alien universe story as a coping mechanism.

Powers and abilities
America Chavez acquired a range of superpowers after being exposed to extra-dimensional energies through experiments conducted on her. She possesses superhuman physical abilities, such as superhuman strength, speed, and durability, and has the power of flight. Her invulnerability allows her to be bullet-proof and flame retardant. Chavez also has the power to kick open star-shaped holes in reality, allowing her and her teammates to travel through the multiverse and into other realities. Chavez is also able to use her powers to travel through time. She can move at superhuman speed, since she is able to catch up to and nearly exceed the speed of light as observed by Spectrum in her light form. Chavez has developed the ability to make an enemy burst into tiny star fragments with a punch. In moments of extreme duress, she has been shown to project a large star that releases a powerful energy blast, capable of injuring the likes of Captain Marvel. She has the power of "cosmic awareness" that allows her to have a metaphysical insight in space and time. America Chavez does not age at a normal rate due to her increased lifespan. She is also a trained hand-to-hand combatant owing to her powers and experience in street fighting.

Cultural impact and legacy

Critical reception 
Nivea Serrao of Entertainment Weekly called America Chavez a "fan favorite" following her appearance in Young Avengers. Dana Forsythe of Paste described America Chavez as a "popular hero," asserting, "America Chavez is a relatively new character, first created by Joe Casey and Nick Dragotta in the pages of Marvel’s 2011 series Vengeance. (For comparison, Doctor Strange and his apprentice Wong debuted in the pages of Strange Tales #110 all the way back in 1951.) But that hasn’t stopped her from rapidly becoming a fan favorite within the broader Marvel Comics universe." Deirdre Kaye of Scary Mommy called America Chavez a "role model" and "truly heroic." Kelly Knox of IGN referred to America Chavez as "headstrong, tough, and fiercely independent," and called her a "team player and natural leader," writing, "She is power, she is grace, she will kick you in… to another dimension! America Chavez is a no-nonsense heavy-hitter that you definitely want on your side." George Marston of Newsarama called America Chavez a "fan-favorite" member of the Young Avengers and the West Coast Avengers teams. Nick Cimarusti of Sideshow named America Chavez one of the "most influential Latinx figures in Marvel Comics." Gavia Baker-Whitelaw of The Daily Dot ranked America Chavez 10th in their "Top 33 Female Superheroes Of All Time" list. Lance Cartelli of GameSpot ranked America Chavez 17th in their "50 Most Important Superheroes" list. Lance Cartelli of Comicbook.com ranked America Chavez 21st in their "50 Most Important Superheroes Ever" list, while Matthew Aguilar referred to America Chavez as a "fan favorite," writing, "Marvel has introduced several amazing characters over the years, and one of the more recent examples is America Chavez." Sarah Brown of Collider included America Chavez in their "30 Marvel Superheroes That Need to Join the MCU" list, calling her a "popular member of the Young Avengers roster." The A.V. Club ranked America Chavez 97th in their "100 best Marvel characters" list. Gemma Goodall of Daily Review included America Chavez in their "10 More Female Superheroes who Deserve a Movie" list, asserting, "Miss America was given her first solo comic book in March of 2017 so it may be a while before we see her on the big screen but I personally can’t wait for that day to come." 

Screen Rant ranked America Chavez 1st in their "Marvel: 10 Incredible Latinx Characters” list, 2nd in their "10 Best Teen Marvel Heroes" list, and 3rd in their "10 Most Powerful Members Of The Young Avengers" list, while CBR.com ranked her 2nd in their "10 Greatest Marvel Heroes Who Draw Power From Alternate Dimensions" list, "13 Most Powerful Hispanic Heroes In Marvel Comics" list 2nd in their "10 Most Powerful Young Avengers" list, 5th in their "20 Strongest Female Superheroes" list, 8th in their "Top Costume Designs Of The Last Decade" list, 9th in their "Marvel: The 15 Strongest New Heroes" list, 10th in their "Marvel's Strongest Cosmic Heroes" list, and 10th in their "Marvel: 10 Best Street Level Heroes" list,

Queer appeal and fandom 
Michele Kirichanskaya of ComicsVerse referred to America Chavez as one of "Marvel's most high-profile LGBTQIA+ heroes," writing, "From the very beginning, America’s story is infused with normalization of the LGBTQIA+ community, from being raised by two mothers, to her own identity as a lesbian. When it comes to LGBTQIA+ characters in fiction, their storylines often follow the same “coming out” narrative; they focus on the major angst of accepting their orientation and society’s hostile reactions to it. While these storylines are important, especially to readers who are personally dealing with those situations, sometimes we simply want the same fun and dynamic adventures that straight characters automatically get. We want stories filled with laughter and romance and badassery, like America’s." Carlos Gomez of Daily Trojan asserted, "America’s character is fascinating because she is relatively new, making her first comic-book appearance in 2011 and growing in popularity since. Part of this has to do with her being an LGBTQ+ woman of color, an often underrepresented demographic. Past that, however, Chavez is a unique and compelling character. Despite being a badass in every sense of the word, she struggles to deal with severe childhood trauma. The stories Marvel could tell with her are countless, and, hopefully, they are already setting up for that." Catrina Dennis of Remezcla found that Gabby Rivera succeeded to represent the Latinx community across America Chavez and praised the character, stating, "America’s journey is likely far from over; she has already proven herself a formidable ally in team-ups, and thanks to her unique power over time and space, she can seamlessly appear in almost any storyline. Nevertheless, we will miss her comic series – not only because it was one of the few Big 2 titles with a Latin woman lead (who also happened to be LGBTQ+) but because the point of view that America holds is one of that’s particularly unique within the endless pages of Marvel comics. The series let fans in on how that affected the seemingly unmovable heroine, humanizing her beyond the gruff exterior that effectively makes her far too cool for any team she happens to join." 

Jason Wiese of Cinema Blend described America Chavez as a "teenage Latina and LGBTQ+ icon," asserting, "In only so much time since her debut, America Chavez is known as one of the more important newer Marvel characters in Marvel Comics for her cultural representation. Despite extra-dimensional origins, when she first came to Earth-616, she was taken in by a Puerto Rican family who informed her ethnic identity. Yet, she represents more than just race." Nicole Chavez of CNN wrote, "Punch-throwing across dimensions wasn’t enough for her. America Chavez is shattering barriers in the comics universe and beyond. She is the first lesbian Latina superhero with her own Marvel Comics series. [...] She isn't the typical heroine, and she isn't the Latina you usually see on screen." Abraham Riesman of Vulture said, "For all too long, the geek world was denied something it deserved — nay, needed: a comics series starring America Chavez. The character, introduced in 2011, is one of a kind: an ornery, queer Latina from another universe who can punch through dimensions. She gained a rabid following after co-starring in the incredible early-2010s Young Avengers title, but her owners at Marvel Comics only recently wised up and gave her her own, the simply titled America."

Timothy Donohoo of CBR.com said, "America has been a part of predominantly critically well-received books, including the aforementioned Young Avengers and appearances in Kate Bishop's Hawkeye title. While she has had loud detractors, it bears repeating that she also rapidly amassed a relatively large and vocal fanbase. Her woes, in part, can be attributed to increased profile coinciding with a time when comics fans have increasingly dug in about "politics" in comics and a particular contingent reacting with venom to what they insist is "forced diversity." As a character, America's usually shown as a somewhat stony individual, being more observant than obnoxious and talkative. These qualities made her a strong figure within the Young Avengers, standing alongside the similarly star-spangled Patriot. Working alongside older heroes like Carol Danvers in the book The Ultimates, her admiration and respect for them was ironically seen as a legacy character done right. Her costume, much like Kamala Khan's, is also a great blend of stylish and superheroic, perfect for a modern multiversal Marvel heroine." May Rude of Out asserted, "Chavez rose to popularity as a part of the Young Avengers team of teen superheroes, before later starring in her own comic series by Gabby Rivera. She’s long been a fan favorite, especially among queer people and Latin fans." Brian Truitt of USA Today stated that America Chavez is one of the characters "who deserve their own movie," saying, "this Latin-American teen lesbian superheroine could be a more groundbreaking choice. She’s bulletproof and super-strong, isn’t big on old-school good guys, and takes no guff. Miss America just sounds like a great movie title — or maybe she takes over the star-spangled shield if Marvel needs a new Captain America one day."  Zack Krajnyak of Screen Rant referred to the potential inclusion of Chavez in the MCU as "incredibly significant," stating that the addition of Miss America a "significant milestone" due to Chavez being a Latin-American LGBTQ character, and stated, "Many have hoped that America Chavez will play a large part in the MCU's future - and with the rumored inclusion of fellow Young Avengers Wiccan in WandaVision and Kate Bishop in Hawkeye, using the character as deep connective tissue seems increasingly likely. Should she truly make her entrance in Doctor Strange in the Multiverse of Madness, much will be resting on America Chavez's shoulders. But if she is anything like her on-page counterpart, this multiverse-traversing powerhouse will light up the screen and then some."  

Michele Kirichanskaya of The Mary Sue stated America Chavez should be one of the characters the MCU should introduce, saying, "As Marvel’s first queer Latin superhero to star in her own series, America Chavez symbolizes long-needed representation for various members of the comic book-loving community. An out and proud Latina lesbian superhero, America Chavez has received an outstanding amount of love and support for her character, including acclaimed author Gabby Rivera, who was Marvel’s first Latin LGBTQ+ author, as well the writer for America Chavez’s comics book series, America," while Michele Kirichanskaya ranked her 6th in their "8 Young, New Heroes the Marvel Cinematic Universe Should Focus on Next" list. Mey Rude of Autostraddle ranked America Chavez 1st in their "7 LGBT Women Who Need to Appear in the MCU Immediately" list, stating, "Marvel, you have this fan-favorite, super dynamic, hilarious character with a super interesting story and the best fashion in all of comics," and ranked her 8th in their "11 Female Superheroes I Wish Marvel Would Make Movies About" list, saying, "This Latina lesbian was my clear favorite character in the recent Young Avengers comic also starring the previously mentioned Hawkeye. She may be a little rough around the edges when you first get to know her, but when she wants to be, she can be as smooth as butter." Ashley C. Ford of BuzzFeed ranked America Chavez 1st in their "12 Kick-Ass Gay Women In Comics And Graphic Novels" list, while Pablo Valdivia ranked her 11th in their "15 Incredible Latino Superheroes You Need To Know" list. Sam Damshenas of Gay Times included America Chavez in their "13 queer superheroes we need to see in the Marvel Cinematic Universe" list, asserting, "If you’ve seen Avengers: Infinity War, you’d understand why she’d be a perfect fit for the sequel." Gavia Baker-Whitelaw of The Daily Dot ranked America Chavez 4th in their "Top 12 LGBTQ superheroes in DC and Marvel comics" list and stated that the character gained a "cult following" after her reappearance in New Avengers, asserting, "She’s a super-strong badass with the ability to fly and travel to other dimensions—not to mention she has one of the most cosplay-able costumes in the Marvel universe. She’s also bisexual, making her the first LGBTQ Latin superhero to get her own solo comic, the excellent 2017 series America."

Literary reception

Volumes

America Chavez - 2017 
According to Diamond Comic Distributors, America #1 was the 37th best selling comic book in March 2017. America #1 was the 343rd best selling comic book in 2017.

Kat Vendetti of ComicsVerse gave America #1 a score of 95%, asserting, "America #1 is full of heart from start to finish. This creative team gives us an America Chavez who is multitudinous and recognizable, and her debut issue is a lively and promising start. This is the comic we’ve all been waiting for. America #1 lives up to all it promised: an unapologetically queer Latina superhero punching a star-shaped hole into a universe where she shines like the star she has always been. Matthew Aguilar of Comicbook.com gave America #1 a grade of 4 out of 5 stars, asserting, "At last! Everyone's favorite no-nonsense powerhouse, America Chavez, gets her own series! Written by critically-acclaimed YA novelist Gabby Rivera (Juliet Takes A Breath) and drawn by all-star artist Joe Quinones (Howard the Duck), Marvel Comics' brand new America series shines a solo spotlight on the high-octane and hard-hitting adventures of the one and only America Chavez! America has always been uncontestably awesome, and as the newly appointed leader of the Ultimates, she's now officially claimed her place as the preeminent butt-kicker of the Marvel Universe! But while leading a team of heroes and punching out big bads is great and all, it doesn't really leave much time for self-discovery… So what's a super-powered teenager do when she's looking for a little fulfillment? She goes to college!" Jesse Schedeen of IGN gave the first comic book 8.5 out of 10, saying, "If there were any doubts that Miss America truly needed her own comic, America #1 should put them to rest. This new series features an engaging take on the adventurous America Chavez, one that emphasizes goofy humor and grounded character drama over superheroics. Anyone who enjoys The Unbeatable Squirrel Girl or Hawkeye will feel right at home here."

America Chavez: Made in the USA - 2021 
According to Comichron, America Chavez: Made in the USA #1 was the 88th best selling comic book in March 2021. According to Diamond Comic Distributors, America Chavez: Made in the USA #1 was the 450th best selling comic book in 2021.

Joe Grunenwald of Comics Beat stated, "As far as debuts go, America Chavez: Made in the USA #1 is damn near flawless. A strong script from an up-and-coming talent combine with strong line art and colors (and, of course, the always-solid work of letterer Travis Lanham) for an incredibly satisfying and enjoyable reading experience. If the remaining issues of this five-issue miniseries can keep up this level of quality we may be looking at an early contender for one of the best Big 2 books of the year." Sam Stone of CBR.com called America Chavez: Made in the USA #1 a "solid opening issue," saying, "Presented, more or less, as a fresh jumping-on point for readers that may not be all that familiar with America Chavez, the opening issue to the character's new comic book miniseries balances action and introspection with a story that examines the superhero's past as it forges her future. Vasquez's scripting especially excels when it delves into her protagonist's psyche, with the present-day sequences more effective than the flashback's retread of her origins. Vasquez finds an effective creative partner in Gomez, bringing the power and responsibility close to home, with the young hero's fight only poised to become more personal as the miniseries continues." Robert Reed of Newsarama gave America Chavez: Made in the USA #1 a grade of 8 out of 10, writing, "The draw to America Chavez: Made in the USA is the character herself, and her past, which hasn't always been rendered with real detail. The team of Vasquez, Gómez, Aburtov, and Lanham creates an intimate look at America's first night with her found family, and sets the foundation for what should be an emotional rollercoaster of a limited series."

Other versions

Hawkeye 
In a possible future depicted in the second volume of the Hawkeye series, an adult America Chavez is a member of S.H.I.E.L.D., and has taken on the mantle of Captain America.

In other media

Television

 America Chavez appears in the Marvel Rising series of animated specials, voiced by Cierra Ramirez.

Film
 America Chavez appears in the 2018 animated film Marvel Rising: Secret Warriors, voiced by Cierra Ramirez. This version's home dimension was attacked by the Kree, which led to her mothers teleporting her to another dimension for her safety before they were killed by Hala the Accuser. Chavez went on to work at an auto garage before reluctantly becoming involved in Squirrel Girl's efforts to rescue her friend Ms. Marvel from their version of Hala the Accuser and eventually found the Secret Warriors.
 America Chavez was originally intended to appear in the Marvel Cinematic Universe (MCU) film Spider-Man: No Way Home (2021), as the sorcerer responsible for opening the portals that brought in alternate reality versions of Spider-Man. However, this idea was eventually scrapped owing to the film releasing before Doctor Strange in the Multiverse of Madness as a result of delays.
 Chavez appears in the MCU film Doctor Strange in the Multiverse of Madness (2022), portrayed by Xochitl Gomez. This version is a supernatural being from the Utopian Parallel with the ability to travel the multiverse. After being attacked by the Scarlet Witch, who seeks to acquire her powers, Chavez eventually ends up in the "prime" universe and joins forces with Doctor Strange to show the Scarlet Witch the error of her ways. Afterwards, Chavez joins the Masters of the Mystic Arts.

Video games
 America Chavez appears as an unlockable playable character in Lego Marvel's Avengers.
 America Chavez appears in the "Marvel's Women of Power" DLC table for Pinball FX 2.
 America Chavez appeared as an unlockable playable character in Marvel Avengers Academy during the "A-Force" event, voiced by Sandra Espinoza.
 America Chavez appears as an unlockable playable character in Marvel: Future Fight.
 America Chavez appears as an unlockable playable character in Marvel Puzzle Quest.
 America Chavez appears as an unlockable playable character in Lego Marvel Super Heroes 2.
 America Chavez appears as a playable character in the mobile app Marvel Strike Force.
 America Chavez appears in the digital collectible card game Marvel Snap.
 America Chavez appears as a playable character in Marvel Contest of Champions.

Web series

 America Chavez appears in Marvel Rising: Ultimate Comics, voiced by Cierra Ramirez.

Board games

 America Chavez appears in Marvel United, published by CMON Limited.

Theme parks 

 The MCU incarnation of America Chavez appears as a meet and greet character at Disney California Adventure.

Collected editions

See also
 Miss America (Madeline Joyce)

References

External links 
 

Avengers (comics) characters
Comics characters introduced in 2011
Fictional characters displaced in other dimensions
Fictional characters with dimensional travel abilities
Fictional immigrants to the United States
Fictional lesbians
Chavez, America
Marvel Comics LGBT superheroes
Marvel Comics characters who can move at superhuman speeds
Marvel Comics characters with superhuman strength
Marvel Comics female superheroes
Marvel Comics mutates
United States-themed superheroes
Time travelers
Marvel Comics child superheroes
Teenage superheroes